Lyubimov or Lubimov is a Russian masculine surname, its feminine counterpart is Lyubimova or Lubimova. It may refer to:

Alexander Lubimov (1879–1955), Russian realist painter and illustrator
Alexei Lubimov (born 1944), Russian pianist, fortepianist and harpsichordist
Lev Lyubimov (1902–1976), Russian journalist, writer and art historian
Mikhail Lyubimov (born 1934), Russian novelist and retired KGB colonel 
Nadezhda Lyubimova (born 1959), Russian rower
Olga Lyubimova (born 1980), Russian politician
Pavel Lyubimov (1938–2010), Russian film director and screenwriter
Yuri Lyubimov (1917–2014), Russian stage actor and director

Russian-language surnames